KITN (93.5 FM MHz) is a radio station licensed to Worthington, Minnesota and serving Nobles County, southwestern Minnesota, and parts of northwestern Iowa. The station is owned by Radio Works, LLC, and broadcasts a classic hits format branded as "93.5 Rewind FM."

History
KITN launched in November 1994, and carried a country music format until 2002, when it flipped to classic hits as "93.5 The Eagle".  Three Eagles Communications, which had recently purchased KITN, KWOA and KWOA-FM (now KUSQ), also owned Luverne based KLQL "K101", which also carried a country format.  In 2007, the classic rock format of "The Eagle" was moved to 95.1 FM, and the adult contemporary format moved was moved 93.5 FM as "93.5 The Breeze".  In 2012, Absolute Communications, which already owned 104.3 FM, purchased Three Eagles' Worthington stations.  The country format on 104.3 FM was moved to 95.1 FM along with the KUSQ call letters. 93.5 FM flipped to a mainstream rock format as "Rock-It 93.5" and 104.3 FM flipped to a Top 40 (CHR) format as "104.3 The Party".  KITN would drop mainstream rock for a classic hits format, branded as "Rewind FM," in January 2023.

References

External links
"Rewind FM" official website

Radio stations in Minnesota
Classic hits radio stations in the United States
Radio stations established in 2002
2002 establishments in Minnesota